Pseudaliidae is a family of nematodes belonging to the order Strongylida.

Genera:
 Halocercus Baylis & Daubney, 1925
 Pharurus Leuckart, 1848
 Pseudalius Dujardin, 1845
 Skrjabinalius Delyamure, 1942
 Stenuroides Gerichter, 1951
 Stenurus Dujardin, 1845
 Torynurus Baylis & Daubney, 1925

References

Nematodes